Coppull is a civil parish in the Borough of Chorley, Lancashire, England.  It contains nine buildings that are recorded in the National Heritage List for England as designated listed buildings, all of which are listed at Grade II.  This grade is the lowest of the three gradings given to listed buildings and is applied to "buildings of national importance and special interest".  The parish contains the village of Coppull and surrounding farmland.  Six of the listed buildings are, or originated as, farmhouses or farm buildings.  The others are a former cotton spinning mill, its office, and the parish church of St John the Divine.

Buildings

References

Citations

Sources

Lists of listed buildings in Lancashire
Buildings and structures in the Borough of Chorley